The 2007 Oregon State Beavers baseball team represented Oregon State University in the 2007 NCAA Division I baseball season. The Beavers played their home games at Goss Stadium. The team was coached by Pat Casey in his 13th season at Oregon State.

The Beavers won the College World Series, defeating the North Carolina Tar Heels in the championship series, for the second consecutive year.

Roster

Schedule 

! style="background:black;color:#d85a1a;"| Regular Season
|-

|- align="center" bgcolor="#ddffdd"
| January 25 || at  || Wong Stadium || 5-0 || Stutes (W; 1-0) || 475 || 1-0 || –
|- align="center" bgcolor="#ddffdd"
| January 26 || at Hawaii-Hilo || Wong Stadium || 17-4 || Paterson (W; 1-0) || 175 || 2-0 || –
|- align="center" bgcolor="#ddffdd"
| January 26 || at Hawaii-Hilo || Wong Stadium || 9-3 || Keim (W; 1-0) || 175 || 3-0 || –
|- align="center" bgcolor="#ddffdd"
| January 27 || at Hawaii-Hilo || Wong Stadium || 10-2 || Maxwell (W; 1-0) || 180 || 4-0 || –
|-

|- align="center" bgcolor="#ddffdd"
| February 9|| at  || Foley Field || 10-8 || McCormick (W; 1-0) || 2,152 || 5-0 || –
|- align="center" bgcolor="#ddffdd"
| February 10|| at Georgia || Foley Field || 7-3 || Reyes (W; 1-0) || 3,010 || 6-0 || –
|- align="center" bgcolor="#ddffdd"
| February 11|| at Georgia || Foley Field || 6-2 || Terpen (W; 1-0) || 2,717 || 7-0 || –
|- align="center" bgcolor="#ffdddd"
| February 16 || vs.  || Surprise Stadium || 5-6 || Grbavac (L; 0-1) || 432 || 7-1 || –
|- align="center" bgcolor="#ddffdd"
| February 17 || vs. Arizona State || Surprise Stadium || 12-4 ||  Paterson (W; 2-0) || 5,582 || 8-1 || –
|- align="center" bgcolor="#ddffdd"
| February 18 || vs. Missouri || Surprise Stadium || 9-2 ||  Turpen (W; 2-0) || 234 || 9-1 || –
|- align="center" bgcolor="#ddffdd"
| February 23 || at  || Dobbins Baseball Complex || 11-2 || Stutes (W; 2-0) || 579 || 10-1 || –
|- align="center" bgcolor="#ffdddd"
| February 24 || vs.  || Dobbins Baseball Complex || 1-4 || Keim (L; 1-1) || 255 || 10-2 || –
|- align="center" bgcolor="#ddffdd"
| February 25 || at  || John Smith Field || 18-5 || Turpen (W; 3-0) || 362 || 11-2 || –
|-

|- align="center" bgcolor="#ffdddd"
| March 2 || at  || Olsen Field || 2-5 || Paterson (L; 2-1) || 4,550 || 11–3 || –
|- align="center" bgcolor="#ddffdd"
| March 3 || vs.  || Olsen Field || 6-2 || Stutes (W; 3-0) || 279 || 12–3 || –
|- align="center" bgcolor="#ddffdd"
| March 4 || vs.  || Olsen Field || 2-0 || Turpen (W; 4-0) || 2-- || 13–3 || –
|- align="center" bgcolor="#ddffdd"
| March 5 || at Texas A&M || Olsen Field || 6-5 || Maxwell (W; 2-0) || 2,908 || 14–3 || –
|- align="center" bgcolor="ddffdd"
| March 8 ||  || Goss Stadium || 9-2 || Stutes (W; 4-0) || 1,907 || 15–3 || –
|- align="center" bgcolor="ddffdd"
| March 9 || Evansville || Goss Stadium || 6-2 || Paterson (W; 3-1) || 1,787 || 16–3 || –
|- align="center" bgcolor="ddffdd"
| March 10 || Evansville || Goss Stadium || 3-2 || Turpen (W; 5-0) || 1,984 || 17–3 || –
|- align="center" bgcolor="ddffdd"
| March 16 ||  || Goss Stadium || 11-1 || Stutes (W; 5-0) || 2,113 || 18–3 || –
|- align="center" bgcolor="ddffdd"
| March 17 || San Francisco || Goss Stadium || 9-2 || Paterson (W; 4-1) || 2,028 || 19–3 || –
|- align="center" bgcolor="ddffdd"
| March 18 || San Francisco || Goss Stadium || 3-2 || Kunz (W; 1-0) || 1,652 || 20–3 || –
|- align="center" bgcolor="ddffdd"
| March 24 || at  || Robin Baggett Stadium || 6-0 || Stutes (W; 6-0) || 2,228 || 21–3 || –
|- align="center" bgcolor="ddffdd"
| March 25 || at Cal Poly || Robin Baggett Stadium || 5-2 || Paterson (W; 5-1) || 2,367 || 22–3 || –
|- align="center" bgcolor="ddffdd"
| March 26 || at Cal Poly || Robin Baggett Stadium || 13-1 || Turpen (W; 6-0) || 734 || 23–3 || –
|- align="center" bgcolor="ffdddd"
| March 30 || at Arizona || Sancet Stadium || 4-5 || Stutes (L; 6-1) || 2,778 || 23–4 || 0–1
|- align="center" bgcolor="ffdddd"
| March 31 || at Arizona || Sancet Stadium || 2-8 || Paterson (L; 5-2) || 2,132 || 23–5 || 0–2
|-

|- align="center" bgcolor="ffdddd"
| April 1 || at Arizona || Sancet Stadium || 14-17 || Turpen (L; 6-1) || 2,217 || 23–6 || 0–3
|- align="center" bgcolor="ddffdd"
| April 5 ||  || Goss Stadium || 9-5 || Stutes (W; 7-1) || 2,274 || 24–6 || 1–3
|- align="center" bgcolor="ffdddd"
| April 6 || Southern California || Goss Stadium || 1-4 || Paterson (L; 5-3) || 2,184 || 24–7 || 1–4
|- align="center" bgcolor="ddffdd"
| April 7 || Southern California || Goss Stadium || 9-8 || Kunz (W; 2-0) || 1,547 || 25–7 || 2–4
|- align="center" bgcolor="ddffdd"
| April 10 ||  || Goss Stadium || 12-4 || Keim (W; 2-1) || 1,128 || 26–7 || –
|- align="center" bgcolor="ddffdd"
| April 13 ||  || Goss Stadium || 1-0 || Stutes (W; 8-1) || 1,835 || 27–7 || 3–4
|- align="center" bgcolor="ffdddd"
| April 14 || California || Goss Stadium || 0-4 || Paterson (L; 5-4) || 1,972 || 27–8 || 3–5
|- align="center" bgcolor="ddffdd"
| April 15 || California || Goss Stadium || 5-3 || Maxwell (W; 3-0) || 1,759 || 28–8 || 4–5
|- align="center" bgcolor="ddffdd"
| April 20 ||  || Goss Stadium || 3-1 || Stutes (W; 9-1) || l,846 || 29–8 || –
|- align="center" bgcolor="ddffdd"
| April 22 || UNLV || Goss Stadium || 10-2 || Paterson (W; 6-4) || l,216 || 30–8 || –
|- align="center" bgcolor="ddffdd"
| April 22 || UNLV || Goss Stadium || 7-0 || Reyes (W; 2-0) || l,216 || 31–8 || –
|- align="center" bgcolor="ddffdd"
| April 24 || at Portland || Joe Etzel Field || 10-1 || Turpen (W; 7-1) || 1,002 || 32–8 || –
|- align="center" bgcolor="ddffdd"
| April 27 || at  || Sunken Diamond || 13-7 || Keitzman (W; 1-0) || l,784 || 33–8 || 5–5
|- align="center" bgcolor="ffdddd"
| April 28 || at Stanford || Sunken Diamond || 7-9 || Maxwell (L; 3-1) || l,756 || 33–9 || 5–6
|- align="center" bgcolor="ddffdd"
| April 29 || at Stanford || Sunken Diamond || 8-6 || Reyes (W; 3-0) || l,931 || 34–9 || 6–6
|-

|- align="center" bgcolor="ffdddd"
| May 4 || vs.  || Safeco Field || 2-6 || Stutes (L; 9-2) || 10,421 || 34–10 || 6–7
|- align="center" bgcolor="ffdddd"
| May 5 || at Washington || Husky Ballpark || 6-9 || Paterson (L; 6-5) || 1,213 || 34–11 || 6–8
|- align="center" bgcolor="ddffdd"
| May 6 || at Washington || Husky Ballpark|| 8-2 || Reyes (W; 4-0) || 983 || 35–11 || 7–8
|- align="center" bgcolor="ffdddd"
| May 11 ||  || Goss Stadium || 4-5 || Stutes (L; 9-3) || 2,327 || 35–12 || 7–9
|- align="center" bgcolor="ddffdd"
| May 12 || Washington State || Goss Stadium || 11-5 || Turpen (W; 8-1) || 2,035 || 36–12 || 8–9
|- align="center" bgcolor="ffdddd"
| May 13 || Washington State || Goss Stadium || 3-5 || Reyes (L; 4-1) || 2,113 || 36–13 || 8–10
|- align="center" bgcolor="ffdddd"
| May 18 || Arizona State || Goss Stadium || 3-4 || Stutes (L; 9-4) || 2,374 || 36–14 || 8–11
|- align="center" bgcolor="ffdddd"
| May 19 || Arizona State || Goss Stadium || 0-3 || Paterson (L; 6-6) || 2,436 || 36–15 || 8–12
|- align="center" bgcolor="ffdddd"
| May 20 || Arizona State || Goss Stadium || 1-8 || Reyes (L; 4-2) || 1,148 || 36–16 || 8–13
|- align="center" bgcolor="ddffdd"
| May 25 || at  || Jackie Robinson Stadium || 10-7 || Turpen (W; 9-1) || 722 || 37–16 || 9–13
|- align="center" bgcolor="ddffdd"
| May 26 || at UCLA || Jackie Robinson Stadium || 13-5 || Paterson (W; 7-6) || 1,287 || 38–16 || 10–13
|- align="center" bgcolor="ffdddd"
| May 27 || at UCLA || Jackie Robinson Stadium || 2-5 || Reyes (L; 4-3) || 942 || 38–17 || 10–14
|-

|-
! style="background:black;color:#d85a1a;"| Post-Season
|-
|-

|- align="center" bgcolor="ddffdd"
| June 1 || vs.  || Davenport Field || 5-1 || Paterson (W; 9-6) || 3,212 || 39–17 
|- align="center" bgcolor="ffdddd"
| June 2 || vs.  || Davenport Field || 4-7 || Kunz (L; 2-1) || 3,212 || 39–18 
|- align="center" bgcolor="ddffdd"
| June 4 || vs. Rutgers || Davenport Field || 5-2 || Reyes (W; 5-3) || 1,984 || 40–18 
|- align="center" bgcolor="ddffdd"
| June 4 || vs. Virginia || Davenport Field || 5-3 || Paterson (W; 9-6) || 3,212 || 41–18 
|- align="center" bgcolor="ddffdd"
| June 5 || vs. Virginia || Davenport Field || 7-3 || Kunz (W; 3-1) || 2,389 || 42–18 
|-

|- align="center" bgcolor="ddffdd"
| June 10 || vs.  || Goss Stadium || 1-0 || Paterson (W; 10-6) || 3,284 || 43–18 
|- align="center" bgcolor="ddffdd"
| June 11 || vs. Michigan || Goss Stadium || 8-2 || Stutes (W; 10-4) || 3,178 || 44–18 
|-

|- align="center" bgcolor="ddffdd"
| June 16 || vs.  || Rosenblatt Stadium || 3–2 || Reyes (W; 6-3) || 26,559 || 45–18
|- align="center" bgcolor="ddffdd"
| June 18 || vs. Arizona State || Rosenblatt Stadium || 12–6 || Stutes (W; 11-4) || 21,692 || 46–18
|- align="center" bgcolor="ddffdd"
| June 20 || vs.  || Rosenblatt Stadium || 7–1 || Turpen (W; 10-1) || 29,921 || 47–18
|- align="center" bgcolor="ddffdd"
| June 23 || vs. North Carolina || Rosenblatt Stadium || 11–4 || Reyes (W; 7-3) || 26,887 || 48–18
|- align="center" bgcolor="ddffdd"
| June 24 || vs. North Carolina || Rosenblatt Stadium || 9–3 || Stutes (W; 12-4) || 25,012 || 49–18
|-

Awards and honors 
Darwin Barney
 College World Series All-Tournament Team

Mitch Canham
 College World Series All-Tournament Team
 All-America Third Team
 All-Pac-10

Mike Lissman
 College World Series All-Tournament Team

Jorge Reyes
 College World Series Most Outstanding Player

Scott Santschi
 College World Series All-Tournament Team

Joey Wong
 College World Series All-Tournament Team

Beavers in the 2007 MLB Draft 
The following members of the Oregon State Beavers baseball program were drafted in the 2007 Major League Baseball Draft.

References 

Oregon State
Oregon State Beavers baseball seasons
College World Series seasons
NCAA Division I Baseball Championship seasons
Pac-12 Conference baseball champion seasons
2007 in sports in Oregon
Oregon State